Hirahata Station (平端駅) is a railway station of Kintetsu Kashihara Line, located in Yamato-Koriyama, Nara, Japan. The Tenri Line diverts from this station.

Lines 
 Kintetsu Railway
 Kashihara Line
 Tenri Line

Platforms and tracks

History
 Feb. 7, 1915—Hirahata Station was opened by the Tenri Light Railway.
 1921—Acquired by the Osaka Electric Tramway.
 1922—The rail gauge was widen into 1,435mm, and Hirhata Station started serving as the terminus of the Unebi Line.
 Mar. 21, 1923—The Unebi Line was extended from Hirahata to Kashiharajingū-mae.
 1941—Owned by the Kansai Express Railway that merged with the Sangu Express Railway.
 1944—Owned by the Kintetsu Railway that merged with the Nankai Railway
 1973—Two platforms for the Tenri Line was newly constructed, along with relocating the southbound Kashihara Line tracks.
 Apr. 1, 2007—PiTaPa, a reusable contactless stored value smart card, has been available.

External links
 

Railway stations in Nara Prefecture